The 1950–51 William & Mary Indians men's basketball team represented the College of William & Mary in intercollegiate basketball during the 1950–51 NCAA men's basketball season. Under the fourth, and final, year of head coach Barney Wilson, the team finished the season 20–11 and 13–6 in the Southern Conference. This was the 46th season of the collegiate basketball program at William & Mary, whose nickname is now the Tribe. William & Mary played its home games at Blow Gymnasium.

The Indians finished in a tie for 4th place in the conference and qualified as the #4 seed for the 1951 Southern Conference men's basketball tournament, hosted by North Carolina State University at Reynolds Coliseum in Raleigh, North Carolina, where the Indians defeated West Virginia in the quarterfinals before losing against Duke in the semifinals.

After appearances in the Cincinnati Invitational Tournament the previous two seasons, William & Mary did not qualify for a post-season tournament this year. The Indians' next post-season appearance would not come until 1983.

Program notes
This was the third of three consecutive 20-win seasons for William & Mary, all under head coach Barney Wilson. This was the only such streak in program history. The Indians' next 20-win season would not come until 1982–83.
The Indians played four teams for the first time this season: St. John's (NY), Marshall, Louisville, and West Virginia.

Schedule

|-
!colspan=9 style="background:#006400; color:#FFD700;"| Regular season

|-
!colspan=9 style="background:#006400; color:#FFD700;"| 1951 Southern Conference Tournament

Source

References

William & Mary Tribe men's basketball seasons
William and Mary Indians
William and Mary Indians Men's Basketball Team
William and Mary Indians Men's Basketball Team